Kerry Lois Smith (29 March 1953 – 20 April 2011) was a New Zealand actor and broadcaster. Between 1978 and 1989, she co-presented the "Top Marks" breakfast show on 89FM in Auckland. She was a presenter on the radio station The Breeze from 2006 to 2011. She was also a presenter for Radio Pacific and Radio Live. On television, she was known for her role as Magda in the 1980s drama series Gloss. She also worked as a television announcer and weather presenter, and was the host of home improvement show Changing Rooms. Smith died following a battle with melanoma.

See also
 List of New Zealand television personalities

References

External links

1953 births
2011 deaths
New Zealand radio presenters
New Zealand television presenters
New Zealand television actresses
Deaths from melanoma
Deaths from cancer in New Zealand
The Breeze (New Zealand radio station)
New Zealand women radio presenters
New Zealand women television presenters